Caldermeade railway station was located on the South Gippsland line in Caldermeade, South Gippsland, Victoria. The station opened on 11 November 1890, when the line from Tooradin was extended to Loch, and was closed to all traffic on 6 October 1958. The station has since been demolished, with no remains intact. However, the track still remains in a reasonable condition.

References

Disused railway stations in Victoria (Australia)